Idalete Rodrigues dos Santos, better known as Idalete Rodrigues (born November 9, 1984 in Pinheiro) is a Brazilian politician. She was vice-president of UEP (2002–2009) and councilor of CEJOVEM (2009–2011). Rodrigues is a president of Socialist Youth of the PDT in Maranhão since December 2011.

References 

Communist Party of Brazil politicians
Cidadania politicians
Democratic Labour Party (Brazil) politicians
Living people
1984 births